The Million Dollar Band was an all-star group of session musicians that often performed on the Hee Haw television variety show from August 1980 through November 1988.

The group's members included some of Nashville's most well-known virtuosos at their respective instruments: Chet Atkins, Boots Randolph, Floyd Cramer, Charlie McCoy, Danny Davis, Jethro Burns and Johnny Gimble, along with Hee Haw co-host Roy Clark. Many of them, at one time or another, were members of The Nashville A-Team, the list of session musicians responsible for creating the famous Nashville Sound. Of the group's eight members, only McCoy (the youngest of the group) is still alive as of 2022.

Its name made reference to the 1956 jam-session Sun Records impromptu group known as "The Million Dollar Quartet", which included Elvis Presley, Jerry Lee Lewis, Johnny Cash and Carl Perkins. Although it primarily played instrumental country music, the Million Dollar Band's jam sessions often included influence from jazz, blues, easy listening and other styles that reflected the diverse interests and instruments of the various musicians involved in the project.

Instrumentation
 Lead guitar:  Chet Atkins
 Rhythm guitar: Roy Clark
 Mandolin: Jethro Burns
 Fiddle: Johnny Gimble
 Saxophone:  Boots Randolph
 Piano:  Floyd Cramer
 Harmonica:  Charlie McCoy
 Trumpet:  Danny Davis

Performance dates
The group performed on the following 27 Hee Haw episodes:

Hee Haw season 13
Episode 287, 08-13-1980
Episode 290, 10-04-1980
Episode 293, 10-25-1980
Episode 296, 10-18-1980
Episode 299, 12-06-1980
Episode 303, 01-17-1981
Episode 309, 02-28-1981
Episode 312, 03-21-1981

''Hee Haw season 14Episode 314, 09-19-1981
Episode 317, 10-10-1981
Episode 320, 10-31-1981
Episode 326, 10-12-1981
Episode 330, 01-23-1982Hee Haw season 15Episode 340, 09-18-1982
Episode 349, 11-20-1982
Episode 353, 12-18-1982
Episode 356, 01-22-1983
Episode 363, 03-12-1983Hee Haw season 16Episode 374, 11-26-1983
Episode 386, 02-25-1984
Episode 390, 03-24-1984Hee Haw season 17Episode 391, 09-22-1984
Episode 396, 10-27-1984
Episode 402, 12-08-1984
Episode 406, 01-05-1985Hee Haw season 18Episode 438, 02-15-1986Hee Haw'' season 21
Episode 503, 11-26-1988

Sources
tviv.org tviv.org episode schedule
tvguide.com episode list

References
The Johnny Gimble website

External links
Photo of the group

Country music supergroups
American country music groups
Musical groups established in 1980